is a city located in Tochigi Prefecture, Japan. ,  the city had an estimated population of 72,189 in 30,136 households, and a population density of 210 persons per km2. The city's name may also be spelled "Ohtawara" as indicated by the official city website.

Geography
Ōtawara is located in northeast Tochigi Prefecture in the foothills of the Nasu region. About 50% of Ōtawara is covered by rice fields with about 12% being mountains and forests. The average elevation of Ōtawara is 217.76 meters. Ōtawara is approximately 40 kilometers north of Utsunomiya, the capital of Tochigi, and approximately 50 km east of the historic city of Nikkō.  The city is long in the east and west direction, and the eastern side of the city is bordered by Ibaraki and Fukushima prefectures. The Yamizo Mountains extend along the prefectural border with Ibaraki Prefecture in the eastern part of the prefecture. Rivers include the Naka River, which runs north–south in the eastern part of the city.

Surrounding municipalities
Tochigi Prefecture
 Nasushiobara
 Sakura
 Yaita
 Nasu
 Nakagawa
Ibaraki Prefecture
 Daigo
Fukushima Prefecture
 Tanagura

Climate
Ōtawara has a Humid continental climate (Köppen Cfa) characterized by warm summers and cold winters with heavy snowfall.

Demographics
Per Japanese census data, the population of Ōtawara has remained relatively steady over the past 70 years.

History
During the Sengoku period, the area was controlled by the Ōtawara clan, who built Ōtawara Castle  in 1545. The surrounding jōkamachi was a shukuba on the Ōshū Kaidō highway to northern Japan. During the Edo Period,  Ōtawara Domain under the Tokugawa shogunate lasted for over 250 years until the Meiji period. Kurobane Domain was another feudal domain which existed within the borders of modern Ōtawara during this time. With the creation of the modern municipalities system on April 1, 1889, the town of Ōtawara was created. On December 1, 1954, the town of Ōtawara and the villages of Chikasono and Kaneda combined to form the city of Ōtawara. The city annexed part of Nozaki Town on December 31, 1954 followed by part of Nishinasuno Town on April 1, 1955 and the town of Sakuyama on November 5, 1955.

On October 1, 2005, the town of Kurobane, and the village of Yuzukami (both from Nasu District) were merged into Ōtawara.

Government
Ōtawara has a mayor-council form of government with a directly elected mayor and a unicameral town council of 21 members. Ōtawara contributes two members to the Tochigi Prefectural Assembly. In terms of national politics, the town is part of Tochigi 3rd district of the lower house of the Diet of Japan.

Economy

Ōtawara is one of the largest rice producing areas in Tochigi. The city is also home to four industrial parks, and industries include corporations such as Toshiba Medical Systems Corporation which sells medical imaging equipment worldwide including CT scans, and Mochida Pharmaceutical Co. Ltd. which specializes in the sales of pharmaceuticals, medical equipment and skincare products.  Tochigi Nikon Corporation, a member of the Nikon Group that designs and manufactures optical products, electronic imaging equipment, semiconductor manufacturing equipment and optical lenses, is also located in Ōtawara.

Education
Ōtawara has 20 public elementary schools and eight public junior high schools operated by the city government, and four public high schools operated by the Tochigi Prefectural Board of Education.  The International University of Health and Welfare is located in Ōtawara.  The university was established in 1995, with the aim of training experts in the field of health and welfare.

Transportation

Railway
 JR East – Tohoku Main Line (Utsunomiya Line)

Highway
  – Nishinasuno-Shiobara IC

Local attractions

Ōtawara is home to several historical and cultural assets:
 Kasaishi Shrine (笠石神社) dating to the 690s AD has one of the oldest surviving example of writing in Japan
Shino Kura Hall is a thatched roof style building dating to approximately the late 1850s or early 1860s, the end of the Edo period. The Hall displays old equipment and other artifacts dating to that time period such as large carts, a foot threshing machine, a packsaddle, and a milk machine.  The Hall also serves handmade soba noodles using home-grown buckwheat.
Unganji (雲巌寺), a Buddhist temple in the east side of Ōtawara, is a location where Matsuo Bashō stopped during the journey recorded in The Narrow Road to the Deep North (Oku no Hosomichi). A stone engraved with a haiku he wrote inspired by what he saw there is displayed.
site of Ōtawara Castle
site of Kurobane Castle
Nasunogahara Harmony Hall
Ōtawara Onsen
Kurobane Onsen

Sports and recreation 
The largest sporting event the city hosts is the Tabara Hiroshi Marathon which is held annually on November 23, Labor Day.  There are ten golf courses in the Ōtawara area, including both public courses and private country clubs such the New St. Andrews Golf Club which is a Jack Nicklaus design course. Ōtawara has a large sports and recreation complex called the Tochigi Prefectural North Gymnasium.  The gymnasium has a main arena for general sports and cultural events and includes two basketball and three volleyball courts, 10 badminton courts, 20 ping-pong tables, one handball court, 10 tennis courts, two wrestling and karate rings.  The arena can seat up to 1,500 spectators.  In addition, there is a separate smaller arena, martial arts area, and training rooms.  Several other gymnasiums, community pools, and sports fields are located throughout the Ōtawara area.

External relations
  - West Covina, California, USA
  – St Andrews, Scotland, UK

Noted people
 Kazue Takahashi, voice actress
 Hokutōriki Hideki, sumo wrestler
 Michio Watanabe, politician
 Masakazu Fukuda, professional wrestler
 Yumiko Ōshima, cartoonist
 Nasu Sukeharu, Muromachi-era daimyō
 Hikaru Midorikawa, voice actor

References

External links

Official Website 
Ōtawara Tourism Association 

Cities in Tochigi Prefecture
Ōtawara